Nodaway Township is an inactive township in Holt County, in the U.S. state of Missouri.

Nodaway Township was erected in 1841, taking its name from the Nodaway River.

References

Townships in Missouri
Townships in Holt County, Missouri